The following is the 1977–78 network television schedule for the three major English language commercial broadcast networks in the United States. The schedule covers primetime hours from September 1977 through August 1978. The schedule is followed by a list per network of returning series, new series, and series cancelled after the 1976–77 season. All times are Eastern and Pacific, with certain exceptions, such as Monday Night Football.

New fall series are highlighted in bold. Series ending their original runs are in italics.

Each of the 30 highest-rated shows is listed with its rank and rating as determined by Nielsen Media Research.

 Yellow indicates the programs in the top 10 for the season.
 Cyan indicates the programs in the top 20 for the season.
 Magenta indicates the programs in the top 30 for the season.

PBS, the Public Broadcasting Service, was in operation, but the schedule was set by each local station. On ABC, debuting news brief, airs all seven nights at 9:58, pm.

Sunday

Monday

Tuesday

Wednesday

Thursday

Friday

Saturday

By network

ABC

Returning Series
The ABC Sunday Night Movie
ABC NFL Monday Night Football
Baretta
Barney Miller
Charlie's Angels
Donny & Marie
Eight Is Enough
Family
Fish
Happy Days
The Hardy Boys/Nancy Drew Mysteries
How the West Was Won
Laverne & Shirley
Monday Night Baseball
The Six Million Dollar Man
Starsky & Hutch
Sugar Time!
Three's Company
Welcome Back, Kotter
What's Happening!!

New Series
20/20
A.E.S. Hudson Street *
Carter Country
Fantasy Island *
Free Country *
The Harvey Korman Show *
Having Babies *
The Love Boat
Lucan
Mel & Susan Together *
Operation Petticoat
The Redd Foxx Comedy Hour *
The San Pedro Beach Bums
Soap
Tabitha
Vega$ *

Not returning from 1976–77:
The Bionic Woman (moved to NBC)
Blansky's Beauties
The Brady Bunch Variety Hour
The Captain and Tennille
Cos
Dog and Cat
The Feather and Father Gang
Holmes & Yoyo
Mr. T and Tina
Most Wanted
The Nancy Walker Show
Rich Man, Poor Man Book II
The Streets of San Francisco
The Tony Randall Show (moved to CBS)
Westside Medical
Wonder Woman (moved to CBS)

CBS

Returning Series
60 Minutes
Alice
All in the Family
Barnaby Jones
The Bob Newhart Show
Busting Loose
The Carol Burnett Show
Good Times
Hawaii Five-O
The Jeffersons
Kojak
M*A*S*H
Maude
The New Adventures of Wonder Woman (moved from ABC)
One Day at a Time
Rhoda
The Shields and Yarnell Show
Switch
Szysznyk
The Tony Randall Show (moved from ABC)
The Waltons

New Series
The Amazing Spider-Man
Another Day *
Baby, I'm Back *
The Betty White Show
Celebrity Challenge of the Sexes *
Dallas *
The Fitzpatricks
Husbands, Wives & Lovers *
The Incredible Hulk *
Logan's RunLou GrantOn Our OwnRaffertySam *The Ted Knight Show *We've Got Each OtherYoung Dan'l BooneNot returning from 1976–77:All's Fair
The Andros Targets
Ball Four
The Blue Knight
Code R
Delvecchio
The Diahann Carroll Show
Doc
Executive Suite
Hunter
The Jacksons
The Keane Brothers Show
Loves Me, Loves Me Not
The Marilyn McCoo and Billy Davis, Jr. Show
The Mary Tyler Moore Show
Nashville 99
Phyllis
Spencer's Pilots
The Sonny and Cher Show
Starland Vocal Band Show
The Tony Orlando and Dawn Rainbow Hour
Who's Who
A Year at the Top

NBCReturning SeriesThe Black Sheep Squadron
The Big Event
The Bionic Woman (moved from ABC)
C.P.O. Sharkey
Chico and the Man
Columbo
Headliners With David Frost
The Life and Times of Grizzly Adams
Little House on the Prairie
NBC Monday Night at the Movies
NBC Saturday Night at the Movies
Police Woman
Quincy, M.E.
The Rockford Files
The Wonderful World of DisneyNew SeriesBig HawaiiCHiPsChuck Barris Rah Rah Show *The Hanna-Barbera Happy Hour *James at 15Joe & Valerie *Man from AtlantisMulligan's Stew *The Oregon TrailProject U.F.O. *QuarkThe Richard Pryor ShowRichie Brockelman, Private Eye *Rollergirls *Rosetti and RyanThe Runaways *Sanford ArmsWhat Really Happened to the Class of '65? *Not returning from 1976–77:'3 Girls 3Emergency!The Fantastic JourneyGemini ManGibbsvilleThe KallikaksKingston: ConfidentialLanigan's RabbiMcCloudThe McLean Stevenson ShowMcMillan & WifeNBC's Best SellersThe NBC Sunday Mystery MoviePolice StoryThe PracticeThe QuestQuinn Martin's Tales of the UnexpectedSanford and SonSerpicoSirota's CourtVan Dyke and CompanyNote: The * indicates that the program was introduced in midseason.

References

Additional sources
 Castleman, H. & Podrazik, W. (1982). Watching TV: Four Decades of American Television. New York: McGraw-Hill. 314 pp.
 McNeil, Alex. Total Television. Fourth edition. New York: Penguin Books. .
 Brooks, Tim & Marsh, Earle (1985). The Complete Directory to Prime Time Network TV Shows'' (3rd ed.). New York: Ballantine. .

United States primetime network television schedules
1977 in American television
1978 in American television